Gaurishankar Agrawal is an Indian politician who was the speaker of the 3rd Chhattisgarh Legislative Assembly. He is a member of the Bharatiya Janata Party and was elected to the assembly from the Kasdol constituency.

References

Speakers of the Chhattisgarh Legislative Assembly
Living people
People from Raipur district
Bharatiya Janata Party politicians from Chhattisgarh
Chhattisgarh MLAs 2013–2018
1952 births
National Institute of Technology, Raipur alumni